Valery Ivanovich Voronin (17 July 1939 – 22 May 1984) was a Soviet footballer who represented Torpedo Moscow and the Soviet national team. He was a versatile defensive midfielder whose impressive technical abilities and hard tackling made him one of the most complete midfielders of the 1960s. He was also capable of playing as a central defender.

Early life
Valery Voronin was born in Moscow, on 17 July 1939. He started playing football in the child team of the Kauchuk factory in 1952. Then Valery moved to the famous FShM, the youth football school that raised many famous players including Igor Chislenko and Vladimir Fedotov. He played for FShM until 1958 when he joined Torpedo Moscow.

Career
During his club career, Voronin played for FC Torpedo Moscow, winning the championship twice, and was the Soviet Footballer of the Year in 1964 and 1965. Between 1960 and 1968 Voronin earned 63 caps and scored 5 goals for the USSR national football team, and represented the country in the 1962 FIFA World Cup and the 1966 FIFA World Cup World Cups. Voronin was considered an individualist which at times conflicted with the ethos of his national team. During the summer of 1968, he was involved in a serious car accident from which he recovered physically but which left him psychologically scarred. He became a heavy drinker and in May 1984 was found murdered. The investigation into his murder never turned up any leads.

Honours

Club
 Soviet Top League: 1960, 1965
 Soviet Cup: 1960
 Soviet Footballer of the Year: 1964, 1965

Individual
 Soviet Footballer of the Year: 1964, 1965
 FIFA World Cup All-Star Team: 1962

References

1939 births
1984 deaths
Soviet footballers
Russian footballers
1962 FIFA World Cup players
1964 European Nations' Cup players
1966 FIFA World Cup players
UEFA Euro 1968 players
Soviet Top League players
FC Torpedo Moscow players
Footballers from Moscow
Soviet Union international footballers
Association football midfielders
Unsolved murders in the Soviet Union